Gonbad Zia (also Romanized as Gonbad Ẕīā’) is a village in Chenaran Rural District, in the Central District of Chenaran County, Razavi Khorasan Province, Iran. At the 2006 census, its population was 34, in 9 families.

References 

Populated places in Chenaran County